Louis D'Heur (born 1889, date of death unknown) was a Belgian sports shooter. He competed in two events at the 1924 Summer Olympics.

References

External links
 

1889 births
Year of death missing
Belgian male sport shooters
Olympic shooters of Belgium
Shooters at the 1924 Summer Olympics
Place of birth missing